Supercell is a mobile phone network in the North Kivu owned by Supercell SPRL. 

Supercell was originally granted a regional 900/1800 GSM-licence for the eastern part of the Congo and started services in July 2002. The concession was later upgraded to cover the whole country, but Supercell operates still a tiny wireless network, limited to Northern Kivu.

References

Mobile_phone_companies_of_the_Democratic Republic of the Congo
North Kivu